Andrzej Kurnicki (born 1958) is a Polish economist. Between 2017 and 2022 Kurnicki served as Polish ambassador to Canada. Kurnicki holds a Ph.D. in economics.

References 

1958 births
Ambassadors of Poland to Canada
Johns Hopkins University alumni
Living people
Polish economists
University of Warsaw alumni